Lowell Blake Mason (July 25, 1893 – July 9, 1983) was the chair of the Federal Trade Commission from January 1, 1949, to May 23, 1950. Mason was the last FTC chair to be selected by the Commissioners, rather than being designated by the President of the United States.

Born in Chicago, Illinois, Mason received an LL.B. from Northwestern University in 1916, and gained admission to the bar in Illinois the same year. From about 1916 to 1922, he served as Assistant Corporation Counsel for the City of Chicago, and from 1922 to 1930, he served in the Illinois Senate, to which he was elected as a Republican. He was elected to the first Illinois State Aviation Commission in 1927, and became General Counsel to the National Industrial Review Board in 1934, and counsel to the Senate Judiciary Subcommittee investigating the National Recovery Act the following year. Around 1938, he began to represent the Washington Senators baseball team.

In 1945, President Harry S. Truman appointed Mason to the Federal Trade Commission, where he served until 1956. On June 14, 1954, Mason received an honorary Doctor of Laws degree from Northwestern University. After leaving the FTC, he practiced law until 1970.

Mason died at Birch Manor Nursing Home in Oak Park, Illinois, at the age of 89.

References

1893 births
1983 deaths
Lawyers from Chicago
Northwestern University alumni
Republican Party Illinois state senators
Federal Trade Commission personnel